Paul Stratford (born 4 September 1955) is an English former professional footballer who played as a striker. He spent his entire career with Northampton Town, scoring 59 goals in 172 appearances in the Football League.

References

1955 births
Living people
English footballers
Association football forwards
Northampton Town F.C. players
English Football League players